Sir Tom Richard Vaughan Phillips,  (born 21 June 1950) is a diplomat who served as Commandant of the Royal College of Defence Studies from 2014 to 2018.

Career
Educated at the University of Exeter, Jesus College, Oxford and Wolfson College, Oxford, Phillips spent three years as a journalist and then undertook diplomatic postings in Zimbabwe, Israel and the United States of America. Phillips became British High Commissioner to Uganda in 2000, UK Special Representative for Afghanistan in 2002 and British Ambassador to Israel in 2006. He went on to be British Ambassador to the Kingdom of Saudi Arabia in 2010 and Commandant of the Royal College of Defence Studies from 2014 to 2018. He is an Honorary Fellow of St Edmund's College, Cambridge.

Family
In 1986 Phillips married Anne de la Motte; they have two sons.

References

|-

|-

|-

Knights Commander of the Order of St Michael and St George
1950 births
Living people
High Commissioners of the United Kingdom to Uganda
Ambassadors of the United Kingdom to Saudi Arabia
Ambassadors of the United Kingdom to Israel